Nawab Jam Sadiq Ali (ca. 1934– 5 March 1992) was a politician from Sindh, Pakistan. He was the Sardar and Nawab of Samaat and Junejo tribes and belonged to the ruling dynasty of Samaa Ja'ams who ruled Sindh over two centuries up to middle of 1700. After his passing in March 1992 he was succeeded by his son Nawab Jam Mashooq Ali Khan. Nawab Jam Mashooq Ali Khan, who had served as a federal minister and a member of the National Assembly of Pakistan multiple times, died in 2018. He was then succeeded by Nawab Jam Zulfiquar Ali Khan, who is the current Chief of the Samaa Jaam and Junejo tribes and Nawab of Sanghar.

Life

Jam Sadiq Ali Khan was Chief Minister of Sindh from 6 August 1990 to 5 March 1992. He was the Sardar of the Samma Jam and Junejo tribes and the Nawab of Sanghar. During Benazir Bhutto's 20-month Government, Mr. Jam Sadiq Ali served as an adviser but eventually resigned because of differences. After Benazir Bhutto was forced to step down in August 1990 because of corruption charges, he was elected Chief Minister of Sindh. 

Jam Sadiq Ali Khan died on 5 March 1992 and was buried at his ancestral graveyard in Goth Nawab Jam Nawaz Ali.

1930s births
1992 deaths
Chief Ministers of Sindh
Sindhi people
Sindh MPAs 1990–1993
People from Sanghar District
St. Patrick's High School, Karachi alumni